Newcastle City Council elections are generally held three years out of every four, with a third of the council being elected each time. Newcastle City Council is the local authority for the metropolitan borough of the Newcastle upon Tyne in Tyne and Wear, England. Since the last boundary changes in 2018, 78 councillors have been elected from 26 wards.

Political control
From 1889 to 1974 Newcastle was a county borough, independent of any county council. Under the Local Government Act 1972 it had its territory enlarged and became a metropolitan borough, with Tyne and Wear County Council providing county-level services. The first election to the reconstituted city council was held in 1973, initially operating as a shadow authority before coming into its revised powers on 1 April 1974. Tyne and Wear County Council was abolished in 1986 and Newcastle became a unitary authority. Political control of the council since 1973 has been held by the following parties:

Leadership
The role of Lord Mayor of Newcastle upon Tyne is largely ceremonial. Political leadership is instead provided by the leader of the council. The leaders since 1959 have been:

County Borough

Metropolitan Borough

Council elections
1998 Newcastle City Council election
1999 Newcastle City Council election
2000 Newcastle City Council election
2002 Newcastle City Council election
2003 Newcastle City Council election
2004 Newcastle City Council election (whole council elected after boundary changes took place)
2006 Newcastle City Council election
2007 Newcastle City Council election
2008 Newcastle City Council election
2010 Newcastle City Council election
2011 Newcastle City Council election
2012 Newcastle City Council election
2014 Newcastle City Council election
2015 Newcastle City Council election
2016 Newcastle City Council election
2018 Newcastle City Council election (whole council to be elected after boundaries changes)
2019 Newcastle City Council election
2021 Newcastle City Council election
2022 Newcastle City Council election

City result maps

By-election results

1994-1998

1998-2002

2002-2006

2006-2010

2010-2014

2014-2018

2018-2022

References

By-election results

External links
Newcastle City Council

 
Council elections in Tyne and Wear
Metropolitan borough council elections in England